Taha Hussein (November 15, 1889 – October 28, 1973) was one of the most influential 20th-century Egyptian writers and intellectuals, and a figurehead for the Egyptian Renaissance and the modernist movement in the Middle East and North Africa. His sobriquet was "The Dean of Arabic Literature".
He was nominated for the Nobel Prize in Literature twenty-one times.

Early life
Taha Hussein was born in Izbet el Kilo, a village in the Minya Governorate in central Upper Egypt. He was the seventh of thirteen children of lower-middle-class parents. He contracted ophthalmia at the age of two, and, as the result of faulty treatment by an unskilled practitioner, he became blind. After attending a kuttab, he studied religion and Arabic literature at El Azhar University; but from an early age, he was dissatisfied with the traditional education system. 

When the secular Cairo University was founded in 1908, he was keen to be admitted, and despite being poor and blind, he won a place. In 1914, he received a PhD for his thesis on the sceptic poet and philosopher Abu al-ʿAlaʾ al-Maʿarri.

Taha Hussein in France 
Taha Hussein left for Montpellier, enrolled in its university, attended courses in literature, history, French and Latin. He studied formal writing but he was not able to take full advantage of it as he "may be used to taking knowledge with his ears, not with his fingers."

He was summoned to return to Egypt due to the poor conditions at the University of Cairo; but three months later, those conditions improved, and Taha Hussein returned to France.

After obtaining his MA from the University of Montpellier, Hussein continued his studies at the Sorbonne. He hired Suzanne Bresseau (1895–1989) to read to him, and subsequently married her. In 1917 the Sorbonne awarded Hussein a second PhD, this time for his dissertation on the Tunisian historian Ibn Khaldun, who is widely regarded as the founder of modern sociology.

Academic career
In 1919 Hussein returned to Egypt with Suzanne, and he was appointed professor of history at Cairo University. He went on to become a professor of Arabic literature and of Semitic languages. 

At the Academy of the Arabic Language in Cairo, Taha Hussein was made responsible for the completion of Al-Mu'jam al-Kabir (The Great Dictionary), one of the academy's most important tasks. He also served as president of the academy.

He was a member of several scientific academies in Egypt and internationally.  

His book of literary criticism On Pre-Islamic Poetry of 1926 that bought him some fame in the Arab world. In this book, he expressed doubt about the authenticity of much early Arabic poetry, claiming it to have been falsified during ancient times due to tribal pride and rivalry between tribes. He also hinted indirectly that the Qur'an should not be taken as an objective source of history. Consequently, the book aroused the intense anger and hostility of the religious scholars at Al Azhar and many other traditionalists, and he was accused of having insulted Islam. However, the public prosecutor stated that what Taha Hussein had said was the opinion of an academic researcher and no legal action was taken against him, although he lost his post at Cairo University in 1931. His book was banned but was re-published the next year with slight modifications under the title On Pre-Islamic Literature (1927).

He was the founding Rector of the University of Alexandria.

Political career

Taha Hussein was an intellectual of the Egyptian Renaissance and a proponent of the ideology of Egyptian nationalism as an Arab nation within the Arab world, arguing in a series of public letters against the Pharaonist Tawfiq al-Hakim that Arab identity is integral to Egyptian identity.

In 1950, he was appointed Minister of Education, in which capacity he led a call for free education and the right of everyone to be educated. He also transformed many of the Quranic schools into primary schools and converted a number of high schools into colleges such as the Graduate Schools of Medicine and Agriculture. He is also credited with establishing a number of new universities and he was the head of the Cultural Heritage of the Ministry of Education . Hussein proposed that Al Azhar University should be closed down in 1955 after his tenure as education minister ended.

Taha Hussein held the position of chief editor of a number of newspapers.

Works
In the West he is best known for his autobiography, Al-Ayyam (The Days) which was published in English as An Egyptian Childhood (1932) and The Stream of Days (1943). 

The author of "more than sixty books (including six novels) and 1,300 articles", his major works include: 
The Memory of Abu al-Ala' al-Ma'arri 	1915
Selected Poetical Texts of the Greek Drama  	1924
Ibn Khaldun's Philosophy  	1925
Dramas by a Group of the Most Famous French Writers  	1924
Pioneers of Thoughts 	1925
Wednesday Talk  	1925
On Pre-Islamic Poetry  	1926
In the Summer 	1933
The Days, 3 Volumes, 1926–1967
Hafez and Shawki  	1933
The Prophet's Life "Ala Hamesh El Sira"  	1933
Curlew's Prayers 	1934
From a Distance 	1935
Adeeb 	1935
The Literary Life in the Arabian Peninsula 	1935
Together with Abi El Alaa in his Prison 	1935
Poetry and Prose 	1936
Bewitched Palace 	1937
Together with El Motanabi 	1937
The Future of Culture in Egypt 	1938
Moments 	1942
The Voice of Paris 	1943
Sheherzad's Dreams 	1943
Tree of Misery 	1944
Paradise of Thorn 	1945
Chapters on Literature and Criticism 	1945
The Voice of Abu El Alaa 	1945
Osman "The first Part of the Greater Sedition
Al-Fitna al-Kubra ("The Great Upheaval")	1947
Spring Journey 	1948
The Stream Of Days 1948
The Tortured of Modern Conscience 	1949
The Divine Promise "El Wa'd El Haq" 	1950
The Paradise of Animals 	1950
The Lost Love 	1951
From There 	1952
Varieties 	1952
In The Midst 	1952
Ali and His Sons (The 2nd Part of the Greater Sedition)	1953
(Sharh Lozoum Mala Yalzm, Abu El Alaa) 	1955
 Anatagonism and Reform 	1955
 The Sufferers: Stories and Polemics (Published in Arabic in 1955), Translated by Mona El-Zayyat (1993), Published by The American University in Cairo, 
Criticism and Reform 	1956
Our Contemporary Literature 	1958
Mirror of Islam 	1959
Summer Nonsense 	1959
On the Western Drama 	1959
Talks 	1959
Al-Shaikhan (Abu Bakr and Omar Ibn al-Khattab) 	1960
From Summer Nonsense to Winter Seriousness 	1961
Reflections 	1965
Beyond the River 	1975
Words 	1976
Tradition and Renovation 	1978
Books and Author 	1980
From the Other Shore 	1980

Translations
Jules Simon's The Duty 1920–1921 	
Athenians System (Nezam al-Ethnien) 	1921
The Spirit of Pedagogy 	1921
Dramatic Tales 	1924
Andromaque (Racine) 	1935
From the Greek Dramatic Literature (Sophocle) 	1939
Voltaire's Zadig or (The Fate) 	1947
André Gide: From Greek 	
Legends' Heroes 	
Sophocle-Oedipe

Tribute 
On November 14, 2010, Google celebrated Hussein's 121st birthday with a Google Doodle.

Honours

See also
 Taha Hussein Museum – Historic house and biographical museum in Cairo
 List of Egyptian authors

References

1889 births
1973 deaths
Egyptian blind people
Al-Azhar University alumni
Nahda
Egyptian novelists
Cairo University alumni
Critics of Arab nationalism
Egyptian nationalists
Muslim writers
Blind writers
Blind academics
University of Montpellier alumni
University of Paris alumni
Egyptian translators
20th-century Egyptian historians
Academic staff of Cairo University
Recipients of the National Order of the Cedar
Pharaonism
People from Minya Governorate
Egyptian liberalists
20th-century translators
Egyptian magazine founders
Egyptian philosophers
Presidents of Academy of the Arabic Language in Cairo